Psyche is the Greek goddess of the soul and often represented with butterfly wings. Psyche was commonly referred to as such in Roman mythology as well, though direct translation is Anima (Latin word for "soul"). She was born a mortal woman, with beauty that rivaled Aphrodite. Psyche is known from the novel called The Golden Ass, written by the Roman philosopher and orator Apuleius in the 2nd century.

Mythology

Early life 

Psyche was the youngest daughter of a Greek king and queen, with two beautiful elder sisters. Her beauty surpassed that of her sisters and people, including priests, compared her to Aphrodite (referred to as Venus in The Golden Ass), the Greek goddess of love and beauty. Many went to the extent of saying that she was even fairer than the goddess. In other iterations, she is not compared to Aphrodite but mistaken for her.

When Aphrodite's temples were deserted because people started worshiping Psyche, the goddess was outraged a mortal was being worshiped over her. As a punishment, she sent her son, Eros, to make Psyche fall in love with a vile and hideous person. However, Eros fell in love when he saw Psyche and decided to spare her from his mother's wrath.

Both of her elder sisters were jealous of her beauty. Her sisters eventually married kings and left to be with their husbands. Nobody asked for Psyche's hand for marriage; men would rather admire her beauty. She was left alone because of how beautiful she was. Desperate, her father decided to consult the Oracle of Delphi at the Temple of Apollo for answers.

Marriage to Eros 

The king consulted the Oracle of Delphi, seeking a solution. Apollo, speaking through the Oracle, said "Despair, king. Your daughter will marry a beast even the gods fear. Dress her in funeral clothes and take her to the tallest rock spire in the kingdom. There, she shall meet her doom." The king returned heartbroken, but obeyed the god's orders.

Psyche was taken to the rock spire and abandoned to her fate. She waited for the beast, but it did not come. In some retellings, Eros is there, only invisible. Zephyrus, the Greek lord of west wind, carried her away from the rock and took her to Eros' palace that was filled with riches.

When Eros returned, he said to Psyche in utter darkness that she must not try to see him, and he can't tell her his name, or it would ruin everything. Psyche's first weeks within the palace are filled with pleasures, but Eros, her husband, informs her that her sisters are coming to the mountain as they believed that she was dead. Since she had been gone, her family had assumed her death and had been in mourning. She obeyed his command to not go out and see them but began thinking of the palace as a prison because of her newfound loneliness.

She wept for days because she was not allowed to see her sisters, which troubled Eros. In order to appease her, he allowed her to see her sisters but warned her of things they might say to try to break them apart. Psyche promised she could not be swayed and was thankful for the chance to see and talk to them. Her two sisters convinced her to see her husband's true form, in case he was tricking her. In other versions, her sisters are jealous of the good fortune Psyche has had: not only being more beautiful but also getting to live such a lavish life. In anger and jealousy, they convince her that her husband is a monster and that she must see for herself who exactly her husband is.

Psyche was eventually swayed by her sisters' words and looked upon Eros while he was sleeping, sneaking into his room with an oil lamp and a knife. As Psyche shone the light on her husband's face, a small drop of hot oil fell onto his shoulder, awakening him and burning him. Betrayed by his wife's actions, Eros ran off to his mother, Aphrodite. After learning what she had done, Psyche was miserable.

Aphrodite found Psyche and made her face four trials. The first trial was to sort a huge mound of seeds. With the help of an sympathetic ant colony, Psyche completed this task. Her next task was to gather wool from a notoriously dangerous sheep. Psyche was helped by a river god, who taught her to collect pieces of wool from bushes. Her next task was to collect water from the underworld. Psyche was now assisted by the eagle of Zeus, who collected the water for her. Psyche's last task was the most difficult; she had to bring back some of Persephone's beauty for Aphrodite. Persephone willingly gave Psyche some of her beauty. When she was near Olympus, Psyche opened the box of Persephone's beauty, but the only thing inside was the essence of death. Psyche died, but her husband, Eros, who had forgiven her, saved Psyche's life and took her to Olympus. Psyche was made the goddess of the soul. Psyche and Eros had a daughter, Hedone, goddess of physical joy.

Retellings

Books 

 "Soul in Darkness" by Wendy Higgins is set in ancient times and remains relatively close to the original myth.
 "Love in Color" by Bolu Babalola is a collection of works that features a story about Psyche and Eros.
 "Till We Have Faces" by C.S. Lewis is not focused on Psyche but instead her sister Orual, giving a different view point of Psyche in myth.
 "Cupid and Psyche" by M. Charlotte Craft is a faithful retelling featuring 40 illustrations to go along with the story.
 "Electric Idol" by Katee Robert is a modern retelling set in her Dark Olympus series where Eros is sent off by his mother, Aphrodite, to kill Psyche.
 "Cupid: A Tale of Love and Desire" by Julius Lester is centered around Cupid in this romantic, light retelling.
 "Destined" by Jessie Harrell focuses on Aphrodite in a retelling that makes Aphrodite someone who is proud of Psyche for her beauty. Aphrodite becomes angered when Psyche refuses to marry her son. Eros cannot carry out her demands and he protects Psyche where romance begins between the two.
 "Painted Blind" by Michelle A. Hansen is a modern retelling set in Montana featuring a model who angers Venus by modeling photos of The Birth of Venus.

See also
 Cupid and Psyche

Notes

References
Lucius Apuleius, The Golden Ass, translated from original Latin by Thomas Taylor, London, 1822. Read online at Internet Archive

Further reading
 
 
 
 
 
 
 
 

Cupid and Psyche
Characters in Roman mythology
Roman goddesses
Greek goddesses
Deeds of Eros
Princesses in Greek mythology
Heroes who ventured to Hades
Deeds of Aphrodite